1oT is a cellular connectivity provider for Internet of Things device makers. 1oT services allow OEMs to connect their devices in more than 150 countries with a single SIM card that is customised for IoT devices and manage their SIM cards on self-service based connectivity platform with API

1oT Terminal 
The 1oT Terminal is a platform where clients can manage and monitor cellular-based IoT devices.
1oT also licenses its connectivity management platform to MNOs. The platform is addressed to small and medium-sized startups to help them scale worldwide and deploy cellular connectivity.

1oT SIMs 
1oT SIM cards work worldwide and offer 2G, 3G and 4G cellular connection.

1oT eSIMs 
1oT launched an eSIM solution for IoT sector at Mobile World Congress 2019.

eSIM is technically known as an embedded Universal Integrated Circuit Card (eUICC). It is an unlocked SIM card that enables the client to manage different carrier services "over-the-air" without the need to physically change the SIM card. Major automotive companies such as Tesla, Mercedes-Benz, and BMW have already deployed commercial services based on eSIM technology. 1oT is opening this revolutionary technology to a wide range of global startups and SMEs.

Background 
The company is part of Mobi Solutions Group. Mobi Solutions is a mobile value-added services provider and developer which during its 15+ years of activity has brought numerous internationally successful telecommunications, IT, and mobile services to the market, for example Fortumo, Messente, Mobi Lab, MobiGW, and Nevercode.

References

External links 
1oT Homepage

Internet of things companies
Estonian companies established in 2016
Technology companies established in 2016